Trowlock Island is a residential island in the River Thames  upstream of Teddington Lock on the non-tidal Kingston reach less than 10 metres from the northern bank, in the London Borough of Richmond upon Thames, England.

Geography

From the Thames Path crossing across the Lock in the north Ham is accessible.

Trowlock Island contains 29 bungalows in plots as well as the Royal Canoe Club's clubhouse and gym. Trowlock Island is about a third of a mile (535 metres) long with a path down the middle and houses on either side. Beyond the last house is a lightly wooded area with moorings on both the main river and the backwater.

History
Like many islands in the Thames, the form of the island has changed over time, being shown as three separate islets on John Rocque's map of 1746. The name derives from Trow, a type of barge averaging 50–60 tons. Harry Gibbs' boat building firm was located on the island in 1910.

Transport

Access is by way of a hand-wound chain ferry.

Maintenance and facilities
Trowlock Island Limited manages the shared infrastructure of the island and its board of directors is elected by the shareholders — each bungalow or plot of land carries with it a number of shares so that all houseowners plus the Royal Canoe Club collectively own the company. The Canoe Club has made a recent significant investment in providing new facilities for young people, including a new gym, boatsheds and training facility. Included in this re-development is a plan for encouraging bio-diversity, such as bats (pipistrelle and Daubenton's bat being the species most likely to be found in the area), water fowl and rare species of cultivated plants.

A short of a video of Trowlock island in summer, that takes a viewer around the island, is available.

Wildlife
The island, with surrounding water and banks of reach of the Thames are home to numerous species of wildlife; the following can be seen as nesting nearby:

Notes and references
Notes 
  
References

See also
Islands in the River Thames

External links
 Environment Agency station at Trowlock Island
 Trowlock Island Community Site

Islands of the River Thames
Geography of the London Borough of Richmond upon Thames
Islands of London